Waterloo Bridge is a road and foot traffic bridge crossing the River Thames in London, between Blackfriars Bridge and Hungerford Bridge and Golden Jubilee Bridges. Its name commemorates the victory of the British, Dutch and Prussians at the Battle of Waterloo in 1815. Thanks to its location at a strategic bend in the river, the bridge offers good views of Westminster, the South Bank and the London Eye to the west, and of the City of London and Canary Wharf to the east.

History

First bridge

The first bridge on the site was designed in 1807–10 by John Rennie for the Strand Bridge of Life and opened in 1817 as a toll bridge. Before its opening it was known as the Strand Bridge.

During the 1840s the bridge gained a reputation as a popular place for suicide attempts. In 1841, the American daredevil Samuel Gilbert Scott was killed while performing an act in which he hung by a rope from a scaffold on the bridge. In 1844 Thomas Hood wrote the poem "The Bridge of Sighs", which concerns the suicide of a prostitute there.

The bridge was depicted by the French Impressionist Claude Monet in his series of 41 works from 1900 to 1904, and by the English Romantic John Constable, whose painting depicting its opening is displayed at Anglesey Abbey in Cambridgeshire.

The bridge was nationalised in 1878 and placed under the control of the Metropolitan Board of Works, which removed the toll from it.

Michael Faraday tried in 1832 to measure the potential difference between each side of the bridge caused by the ebbing salt water flowing through the Earth's magnetic field using magnetohydrodynamics.

Serious problems were found in Rennie's bridge piers from 1884 onward, after scour from the river flow (which had increased following the demolition of Old London Bridge) damaged their foundations. By the 1920s the problems had increased, and settlement at pier five necessitated the closure of the whole bridge while some heavy superstructure was removed and temporary reinforcements were put in place.

In 1925, a temporary steel framework was built on top of the existing bridge and then placed next to it for the use of southbound vehicles (the postcard image shows this, and the settlement especially to the left of the fifth pier).

Second bridge

In the 1930s London County Council decided to demolish the bridge and replace it with a new structure designed by Sir Giles Gilbert Scott. The engineers were Ernest Buckton and John Cuerel of Rendel Palmer & Tritton. The project was placed on hold due to the Second World War.

Scott, by his own admission, was no engineer, and his design, with reinforced concrete beams (illustrated) under the footways, leaving the road to be supported by transverse slabs, was difficult to implement. The pairs of spans on each side of the river were supported by beams continuous over their piers, and these were cantilevered out at their ends to support the centre span and the short approach slabs at the banks. The beams were shaped "to look as much like arches as ... beams can". They are clad in Portland stone, which is cleaned by rain. To guard against the possibility of further subsidence from scour, each pier was given a number of jacks that can be used to level the structure.

Construction of the new bridge began in 1937 and it was partially opened on Tuesday 11 March 1942 and "officially opened" in September 1942. However, it was not fully completed until 1945. It is the only Thames bridge to have been damaged by German bombers during the Second World War.

The building contractor was Peter Lind & Company. 

. Lind used elm wood from the old bridge for the dining room floor of Hamstone House, his house that he commissioned and built in 1938 at St George's Hill in Surrey.

Georgi Markov, a Bulgarian dissident, was assassinated on Waterloo Bridge on 7 September 1978 by agents of the Bulgarian secret police, the Committee for State Security, possibly assisted by the Soviet security agency, the KGB. He was killed with a poisoned pellet possibly fired from an umbrella.

Reuse of original parts
Granite stones from the original bridge were subsequently "presented to various parts of the British world to further historic links in the British Commonwealth of Nations". Two of these stones are in Canberra, the capital city of Australia, sited between the parallel spans of the Commonwealth Avenue Bridge, one of two major crossings of Lake Burley Griffin in the heart of the city. Stones from the bridge were also used to build a monument in Wellington, New Zealand, to Paddy the Wanderer, a dog that roamed the wharves from 1928 to 1939 and was befriended by seamen, watersiders, Harbour Board workers and taxi drivers. The monument, built in 1945, is on Queens Wharf, opposite the Wellington Museum. It includes a bronze likeness of Paddy, a drinking fountain, and drinking bowls below for dogs. 

Another piece of the stone is situated under the sundial in the Wellington Boat Harbour Park, next to Clyde Quay Marina, an area of historical significance in Wellington Harbour. Several stone balusters from the demolished bridge were sent in the late 1930s by the author Dornford Yates to be used in his French home 'Cockade', but the Fall of France in 1940 interrupted this project. They were shipped after the war to his new house in Umtali, Rhodesia (now Mutare, Zimbabwe).

Recovered timbers from the bridge were used for shelves and wall panels in the library at Anglesey Abbey.

Geography

The south end of the bridge is in the area known as the South Bank, which includes the Royal Festival Hall, London Waterloo, Queen Elizabeth Hall and the Royal National Theatre, as well as the BFI Southbank, which is directly beneath the bridge.

The north end of the bridge passes above the Victoria Embankment where the road joins the Strand and Aldwych alongside Somerset House. This end housed the southern portal of the Kingsway Tramway Subway until the late 1950s.

The entire bridge was given Grade II* listed structure protection in 1981.

The nearest London Underground station is Temple, the nearest National Rail station is London Waterloo.

In popular culture

Robert E. Sherwood's play Waterloo Bridge (1930), the story of a soldier who falls in love and marries a woman he meets on the bridge in an air raid during the First World War, was made into films released in 1931, 1940 and 1956. The second of these film versions starred Vivien Leigh and Robert Taylor.
"After the Lunch", a poem by Wendy Cope about two lovers parting on Waterloo Bridge, now forms the lyric of the song "Waterloo Bridge" by Jools Holland and Louise Marshall.
The bridge features in the film A Window in London (1940). The hero, played by Michael Redgrave, is a crane driver who is working on the construction of the bridge. Images can be seen of the incomplete rebuilding work in progress.
The bridge features in scenes at the beginning and end of the film Alfie (1966), starring Michael Caine. In the final scene of the film the title character is seen crossing the bridge followed by a stray dog.
The song "Waterloo Sunset" by the British band The Kinks tells of living in London and watching life from Waterloo Bridge.
A scene in "The Great Game", an episode of the BBC television series Sherlock, takes place beneath the bridge's northern side, where members of Sherlock's network of homeless informants congregate.
The bridge features in the closing scene of the 1996 film Trainspotting.

See also
 List of crossings of the River Thames
 List of bridges in London

References

External links

Survey of London entry
 
 

Bridges across the River Thames
Bridges completed in 1817
Bridges completed in 1945
Buildings and structures in the City of Westminster
Buildings and structures in the London Borough of Lambeth
Rebuilt buildings and structures in the United Kingdom
Grade II* listed buildings in the City of Westminster
Grade II* listed bridges in London
Transport in the London Borough of Lambeth
Transport in the City of Westminster
Former toll bridges in England
Giles Gilbert Scott buildings
Bridges in London
Bridge light displays